This is a list of the members of the Australian House of Representatives in the 17th Australian Parliament, which was elected at the 1943 election on 21 August 1943. The incumbent Australian Labor Party led by Prime Minister of Australia John Curtin defeated the opposition Country Party led by Arthur Fadden with coalition partner the United Australia Party (UAP) led by Billy Hughes. On 21 February 1945, the parliamentary UAP was dissolved and replaced by the newly established Liberal Party.

Notes

References

Members of Australian parliaments by term
20th-century Australian politicians